In the Name of Life is a 1947 Soviet drama film directed by Iosif Kheifits and Aleksandr Zarkhi and starring Viktor Khokhryakov, Mikhail Kuznetsov and Oleg Zhakov.

Plot 
Three young surgeons are working on the problem of cell recovery – two of them give up but Dr Petrov continues his research. In difficult times, he supports the budding actress Lena Pogodina, with whom he is in love.

Cast
 Viktor Khokhryakov as Doctor Vladimir Petrov 
 Mikhail Kuznetsov as Doctor Aleksandr Kolesov 
 Oleg Zhakov as Doctor Aleksei Rozhdestvensky  
 Klavdiya Lepanova as Lena  
 Lyudmila Shabalina as Vera  
 Mikhail Rostovtsev as Uchenyi
 Nikolai Cherkasov as Lukich, the attendant 
 Margarita Gromyko as Anushka 
 Aleksandr Zrazhevsky 
 Boris Kudryavtsev 
 Vladimir Dorofeyev

References

Bibliography
 Liehm, Mira / Liehm, Antonín J. The Most Important Art: Eastern European Film After 1945. University of California Press, 1977.

External links

Soviet drama films
1947 drama films
1947 films
1940s Russian-language films
Films directed by Iosif Kheifits
Films directed by Aleksandr Zarkhi
Soviet black-and-white films